Golden Feelings is the debut studio album by American musician Beck, released in 1993 by Sonic Enemy. The album showcases his roots in the anti-folk scene. Initially available only in limited quantities on cassette, Sonic Enemy remastered the album and re-released it on CD in 1999. Beck was upset that they did so without his permission, and after he made his displeasure known, Sonic Enemy ceased to press any more copies. Only 2,000 were made, causing the CD to become quite valuable.

Reception

AllMusic described the album as "an extremely interesting, entertaining, and humorous document that proves that from the start Beck had his heart set on making experimentation his only gimmick."

UDiscoverMusic wrote that the album had varisped vocals and backward tapes, that "battle with cut-and-pasted audio scraps, weird, dissonant effects and deranged screams, in an oddly involving and darkly humorous excursion to Dystopia". They also wrote that Golden Feelings was anarchic and "sometimes not entirely listenable", but that "the contents of that lowest of lo-fi cassettes were nonetheless compelling".

Track listing
All songs written by Beck.

References

External links

Discogs entry

Beck albums
1993 debut albums
Albums produced by Beck